West Antelope Township is a civil township in Benson County, North Dakota, United States.

In 2010, it had a population of 21 inhabitants and a population density of 0.23 people per km2.

Geography
According to the United States Census Bureau, the township has a total area of 93 km2, of which 92.73 km2 is land and (0.29%) 0.27 km2 is water.

Demographics
According to the 2010 census, there were 21 people living in the township of West Antelope. The population density was 0.23 inhabitants/km2. The entire population was white. As of the 2000 census, its population had been 33.

References

Townships in Benson County, North Dakota
Townships in North Dakota